The Aboti Brahmin are a Sakaldwipiya Brahmin community living in western part of India. They are mainly agricultural community who were recorded living in Rajasthan, India, around 1228 CE (1306 VS), where they were usually temple servants and had migrated from Dvaravati. Today, they are found in the state of Gujarat . They perform puja at the Dwarkadhish Temple in Dwarka during the Hindu festival of Janmashtami.

In addition to their priestly role at Dwarka, they are a farming community, and in 1961 were noted to have been illiterate.

See also 
Rajpurohit
Jangid

References

Further reading 

porbandar dist all

Brahmin communities of Rajasthan